An arrow is a graphical symbol, such as ← or →, or a pictogram, used to point or indicate direction. In its simplest form, an arrow is a triangle, chevron, or concave kite, usually
affixed to a line segment or rectangle, and in more complex forms a representation of an actual arrow (e.g. ➵ U+27B5). The direction indicated by an arrow is the one along the length of the line or rectangle toward the single pointed end.

History
An older (medieval) convention is  the  manicule (pointing hand, 👈).
Pedro Reinel in c. 1504 first used the  fleur-de-lis as indicating north in a compass rose; 
the convention of marking the eastern direction with a cross is older (medieval).
Use of the arrow symbol does not appear to pre-date the 18th century. An early arrow symbol is found in an illustration of Bernard Forest de Bélidor's treatise L'architecture hydraulique, printed in France in 1737. The arrow is here used to illustrate the direction of the flow of water and of the water wheel's rotation. At about the same time, arrow symbols were used to indicate the flow of rivers in maps.

A trend toward abstraction, in which the arrow's fletching is removed, can be observed in the mid-to-late 19th century. The arrow can be seen in the work of Paul Klee. In a further abstraction of the symbol, John Richard Green's A Short History of the English People of 1874 contained maps by cartographer Emil Reich, which indicated army movements by curved lines, with solid triangular arrowheads placed intermittently along the lines.

Use of arrow symbols in mathematical notation is still younger and develops in the first half of the 20th century.
David Hilbert in 1922 introduced the arrow symbol representing logical implication. 
The double-headed arrow representing logical equivalence was introduced by Albrecht Becker in Die Aristotelische Theorie der Möglichkeitsschlüsse, Berlin, 1933.

Usage

Arrows are universally recognised for indicating directions. They are widely used on signage and for wayfinding, and are often used in road surface markings.

Upward arrows are often used to indicate an increase in a numerical value, and downward arrows indicate a decrease.

In mathematical logic, a right-facing arrow indicates material conditional, and a left-right (bidirectional) arrow indicates if and only if, an upwards arrow indicates the NAND operator (negation of conjunction), an downwards arrow indicates the NOR operator (negation of disjunction).

Unicode
In Unicode, the block Arrows occupies the hexadecimal range U+2190–U+21FF, as described below.

By block 

Additional arrows can be found in the Combining Diacritical Marks, Combining Diacritical Marks Extended, Combining Diacritical Marks for Symbols, Halfwidth and Fullwidth Forms, Miscellaneous Mathematical Symbols-B, Miscellaneous Symbols and Pictographs, Miscellaneous Technical, Modifier Tone Letters and Spacing Modifier Letters Unicode blocks.

See also
 Dingbat
 Box Drawing (Unicode Block)
 Block Elements (Unicode Block)
 Geometric Shapes (Unicode Block)
 Box-drawing character

References
J. R. Finkel,  "History of the Arrow", Up Down Left Right (2011)

External links
 Semantics of Simple Arrow Diagrams
 Emojipedia
 Complete list of arrow symbols

Logic symbols
Pictograms
Unicode